Cheung Shue Tan is a village in Pak Shek Kok, Tai Po District, Hong Kong.

Administration
Cheung Shue Tan is a recognized village under the New Territories Small House Policy.

Features
The Kong Ancestral Hall, the Yau Chan Fei Ancestral Hall, the Wan Ancestral Hall and the Hip Tin Temple (樟樹灘村協天宮) in Cheung Shue Tan are listed as Grade III historic buildings.

See also
 Pak Shek Kok

References

External links

 Delineation of area of existing village Cheung Shue Tan (Tai Po) for election of resident representative (2019 to 2022)
 Antiquities Advisory Board. Historic Building Appraisal. Hip Tin Temple, Cheung Shue Tan Pictures

Villages in Tai Po District, Hong Kong
Pak Shek Kok